Main page: List of Canadian plants by family

Families:
A | B | C | D | E | F | G | H | I J K | L | M | N | O | P Q | R | S | T | U V W | X Y Z

Cabombaceae 

 Brasenia schreberi — watershield

Cactaceae 

 Escobaria vivipara — foxtail pincushion cactus
 Opuntia fragilis — brittle prickly-pear
 Opuntia humifusa — eastern prickly-pear
 Opuntia polyacantha — panhandle prickly-pear

Callitrichaceae 

 Callitriche hermaphroditica — autumnal water-starwort
 Callitriche heterophylla — large water-starwort
 Callitriche marginata — winged water-starwort
 Callitriche palustris — vernal water-starwort
 Callitriche terrestris — terrestrial water-starwort

Calypogeiaceae 

 Calypogeia fissa
 Calypogeia integristipula
 Calypogeia muelleriana
 Calypogeia neesiana
 Calypogeia sphagnicola
 Calypogeia suecica
 Calypogeia trichomanis
 Metacalypogeia schusterana

Campanulaceae 

 Asyneuma prenanthoides — California harebell
 Campanula aparinoides — marsh bellflower
 Campanula aurita — Yukon bellflower
 Campanula lasiocarpa — common Alaska harebell
 Campanula parryi — Parry's northern harebell
 Campanula rotundifolia — American harebell
 Campanula scouleri — Scouler's bellflower
 Campanula uniflora — Arctic harebell
 Campanulastrum americanum — tall bellflower
 Downingia elegans — common downingia
 Downingia laeta — Great Basin downingia
 Githopsis specularioides — common blue-cup
 Heterocodon rariflorum — western pearl-flower
 Lobelia cardinalis — cardinal-flower
 Lobelia dortmanna — water lobelia
 Lobelia inflata — Indian-tobacco
 Lobelia kalmii — Kalm's lobelia
 Lobelia siphilitica — great blue lobelia
 Lobelia spicata — palespike lobelia
 Lobelia x speciosa
 Triodanis perfoliata — claspingleaf Venus'-looking-glass

Cannabaceae 
 Celtis occidentalis — common hackberry
 Celtis tenuifolia — dwarf hackberry
 Humulus lupulus — common hop

Capparaceae 

 Cleome serrulata — bee spiderflower
 Polanisia dodecandra — common clammyweed

Caprifoliaceae 

 Diervilla lonicera — northern bush-honeysuckle
 Linnaea borealis — twinflower
 Lonicera caerulea — western honeysuckle
 Lonicera canadensis — American fly-honeysuckle
 Lonicera ciliosa — orange honeysuckle
 Lonicera dioica — mountain honeysuckle
 Lonicera hirsuta — hairy honeysuckle
 Lonicera hispidula — California honeysuckle
 Lonicera involucrata — four-line honeysuckle
 Lonicera oblongifolia — swamp fly-honeysuckle
 Lonicera reticulata — grape honeysuckle
 Lonicera utahensis — Utah honeysuckle
 Lonicera villosa — mountain fly-honeysuckle
 Sambucus nigra — common elderberry
 Sambucus racemosa — red elderberry
 Symphoricarpos albus — snowberry
 Symphoricarpos hesperius — spreading snowberry
 Symphoricarpos occidentalis — northern snowberry
 Symphoricarpos oreophilus — mountain snowberry
 Triosteum angustifolium — yellowleaf tinker's-weed
 Triosteum aurantiacum — coffee tinker's-weed
 Triosteum perfoliatum — perfoliate tinker's-weed

Caryophyllaceae 

 Arenaria capillaris — fescue sandwort
 Arenaria congesta — capitate sandwort
 Arenaria humifusa — creeping sandwort
 Arenaria longipedunculata — low sandwort
 Cerastium alpinum — alpine chickweed
 Cerastium arvense — mouse-ear chickweed
 Cerastium beeringianum — Bering Sea chickweed
 Cerastium brachypodum — mouse-ear chickweed
 Cerastium cerastioides — starwort chickweed
 Cerastium fischerianum — Fischer's chickweed
 Cerastium maximum — great chickweed
 Cerastium nigrescens — black mouse-ear chickweed
 Cerastium nutans — nodding chickweed
 Cerastium regelii — Regel's chickweed
 Dianthus repens — carnation
 Honckenya peploides — seabeach sandwort
 Lychnis alpina — alpine campion
 Minuartia arctica — Arctic stitchwort
 Minuartia austromontana — Columbian stitchwort
 Minuartia biflora — mountain stitchwort
 Minuartia dawsonensis — rock stitchwort
 Minuartia elegans — Ross' stitchwort
 Minuartia groenlandica — mountain sandwort
 Minuartia litorea
 Minuartia macrocarpa — longpod stitchwort
 Minuartia marcescens — serpentine stitchwort
 Minuartia michauxii — Michaux's stitchwort
 Minuartia nuttallii — Nuttall's stitchwort
 Minuartia obtusiloba — alpine stitchwort
 Minuartia pusilla — dwarf stitchwort
 Minuartia rossii — Ross' stitchwort
 Minuartia rubella — boreal stitchwort
 Minuartia stricta — rock sandwort
 Minuartia tenella — slender stitchwort
 Minuartia yukonensis — Yukon stitchwort
 Moehringia lateriflora — grove sandwort
 Moehringia macrophylla — largeleaf sandwort
 Paronychia canadensis — forked nailwort
 Paronychia fastigiata — cluster-stemmed nailwort
 Paronychia sessiliflora — low nailwort
 Sagina caespitosa — tufted pearlwort
 Sagina decumbens — small-flowered pearlwort
 Sagina maxima — sticky-stem pearlwort
 Sagina nivalis — snow pearlwort
 Sagina nodosa — knotted pearlwort
 Sagina saginoides — Arctic pearlwort
 Silene acaulis — moss campion
 Silene antirrhina — sleepy catchfly
 Silene douglasii — Douglas' campion
 Silene drummondii — Drummond's campion
 Silene involucrata — Arctic catchfly
 Silene menziesii — Menzies' pink
 Silene parryi — Parry's campion
 Silene repens — creeping catchfly
 Silene scouleri — Scouler's catchfly
 Silene sorensenis — Sorensen's catchfly
 Silene spaldingii — Spalding's campion
 Silene taimyrensis — Taimyr catchfly
 Silene tayloriae — Peel River catchfly
 Silene uralensis — apetalous catchfly
 Silene x hampeana
 Spergularia canadensis — Canada sandspurry
 Spergularia macrotheca — beach sandspurry
 Spergularia salina — saltmarsh sandspurry
 Stellaria alaskana — Alaska starwort
 Stellaria alsine — trailing stitchwort
 Stellaria americana — American stitchwort
 Stellaria borealis — northern stitchwort
 Stellaria calycantha — northern stitchwort
 Stellaria ciliatosepala — tundra stitchwort
 Stellaria crassifolia — fleshy stitchwort
 Stellaria crassipes — tundra starwort
 Stellaria crispa — crimped stitchwort
 Stellaria dicranoides — matted starwort
 Stellaria humifusa — creeping sandwort
 Stellaria longifolia — longleaf stitchwort
 Stellaria longipes — long-stalked stitchwort
 Stellaria nitens — shiny stitchwort
 Stellaria obtusa — Rocky Mountain stitchwort
 Stellaria umbellata — umbellate stitchwort
 Wilhelmsia physodes — merkia

Catoscopiaceae 

 Catoscopium nigritum

Celastraceae 

 Celastrus scandens — climbing bittersweet
 Euonymus atropurpureus — wahoo
 Euonymus obovatus — running strawberry-bush
 Euonymus occidentalis — western strawberry-bush
 Paxistima myrsinites — Oregon boxleaf

Cephaloziaceae 

 Cephalozia affinis
 Cephalozia bicuspidata
 Cephalozia catenulata
 Cephalozia connivens
 Cephalozia lacinulata
 Cephalozia leucantha
 Cephalozia loitlesbergeri
 Cephalozia lunulifolia
 Cephalozia macounii
 Cephalozia macrostachya
 Cephalozia pleniceps
 Cladopodiella fluitans — cladopodiella moss
 Cladopodiella francisci
 Hygrobiella laxifolia
 Nowellia curvifolia
 Pleuroclada albescens
 Schofieldia monticola

Cephaloziellaceae 

 Cephaloziella arctica
 Cephaloziella brinkmani
 Cephaloziella divaricata
 Cephaloziella elachista
 Cephaloziella hampeana
 Cephaloziella massalongi
 Cephaloziella phyllacantha
 Cephaloziella rubella
 Cephaloziella spinigera
 Cephaloziella subdentata
 Cephaloziella turneri
 Cephaloziella uncinata

Ceratophyllaceae 

 Ceratophyllum demersum — common hornwort
 Ceratophyllum echinatum — prickly hornwort

Chenopodiaceae 

 Atriplex acadiensis — maritime saltbush
 Atriplex alaskensis — Alaska orache
 Atriplex argentea — silvery saltbush
 Atriplex canescens — four-wing saltbush
 Atriplex falcata — sickle saltbush
 Atriplex franktonii — Frankton's saltbush
 Atriplex gardneri — Gardner's saltbush
 Atriplex glabriuscula — northeastern saltbush
 Atriplex gmelinii — Gmelin's saltbush
 Atriplex littoralis — tropical saltbush
 Atriplex nudicaulis — Baltic saltbush
 Atriplex nuttallii — Nuttall's saltbush
 Atriplex patula — halberd-leaf orache
 Atriplex powellii — Powell's saltbush
 Atriplex prostrata — creeping saltbush
 Atriplex subspicata — orache
 Atriplex truncata — wedge-leaved saltbush
 Atriplex x aptera
 Chenopodium album — Missouri goosefoot
 Chenopodium atrovirens — dark goosefoot
 Chenopodium berlandieri — pitseed goosefoot
 Chenopodium capitatum — strawberry goosefoot
 Chenopodium desiccatum — narrowleaf goosefoot
 Chenopodium foggii — Fogg's goosefoot
 Chenopodium fremontii — Fremont's goosefoot
 Chenopodium hians — Hian's goosefoot
 Chenopodium humile — marshland goosefoot
 Chenopodium incanum — mealy goosefoot
 Chenopodium leptophyllum — narrowleaf goosefoot
 Chenopodium pratericola — desert goosefoot
 Chenopodium rubrum — coastblite goosefoot
 Chenopodium salinum — Rocky Mountain goosefoot
 Chenopodium simplex — giantseed goosefoot
 Chenopodium standleyanum — Standley's goosefoot
 Chenopodium subglabrum — smooth goosefoot
 Chenopodium watsonii — Watson's goosefoot
 Corispermum americanum — American bugseed
 Corispermum hookeri — Hooker's bugseed
 Corispermum ochotense — Okhotian bugseed
 Corispermum pallasii — Pallas' bugseed
 Corispermum villosum — hairy bugseed
 Cycloloma atriplicifolium — winged pigweed
 Endolepis dioica — Suckley's saltbush
 Krascheninnikovia lanata — winter-fat
 Monolepis nuttalliana — Nuttall's poverty-weed
 Salicornia borealis — boreal saltwort
 Salicornia maritima — jointed glasswort
 Salicornia rubra — western glasswort
 Salicornia virginica — Virginia glasswort
 Sarcobatus vermiculatus — black greasewood
 Sarcocornia pacifica — Pacific glasswort
 Suaeda calceoliformis — American sea-blite
 Suaeda maritima — herbaceous seepweed
 Suaeda moquinii — shrubby seepweed
 Suaeda rolandii — Rolands' sea-blite
 Suckleya suckleyana — poison suckleya

Cistaceae 

 Helianthemum bicknellii — plains frostweed
 Helianthemum canadense — Canada frostweed
 Hudsonia ericoides — golden-heather
 Hudsonia tomentosa — sand-heather
 Lechea intermedia — narrowleaf pinweed
 Lechea maritima — beach pinweed
 Lechea mucronata — hairy pinweed
 Lechea pulchella — Leggett's pinweed
 Lechea stricta — upright pinweed
 Lechea tenuifolia — slender pinweed

Clethraceae 

 Clethra alnifolia — coast pepperbush

Cleveaceae 

 Athalamia hyalina
 Peltolepis quadrata
 Sauteria alpina

Climaciaceae 

 Climacium americanum — tree moss
 Climacium dendroides — tree climacium moss

Clusiaceae 

 Hypericum anagalloides — tinker's-penny
 Hypericum ascyron — great St. John's-wort
 Hypericum boreale — northern St. John's-wort
 Hypericum canadense — Canadian St. John's-wort
 Hypericum dissimulatum — disguised St. John's-wort
 Hypericum ellipticum — pale St. John's-wort
 Hypericum gentianoides — orange-grass St. John's-wort
 Hypericum kalmianum — Kalm's St. John's-wort
 Hypericum majus — larger Canadian St. John's-wort
 Hypericum mutilum — slender St. John's-wort
 Hypericum prolificum — shrubby St. John's-wort
 Hypericum punctatum — common St. John's-wort
 Hypericum scouleri — western St. John's-wort
 Hypericum sphaerocarpum — roundfruit St. John's-wort
 Triadenum fraseri — marsh St. John's-wort
 Triadenum virginicum — Virginia marsh St. John's-wort

Commelinaceae 

 Tradescantia occidentalis — prairie spiderwort
 Tradescantia ohiensis — Ohio spiderwort

Conocephalaceae 

 Conocephalum conicum — snakeskin liverwort

Convolvulaceae 

 Calystegia macounii — Macoun's bindweed
 Calystegia sepium — hedge false bindweed
 Calystegia silvatica — shortstalk false bindweed
 Calystegia soldanella — seashore bindweed
 Calystegia spithamaea — low bindweed
 Ipomoea pandurata — bigroot morning-glory

Cornaceae 

 Cornus alternifolia — alternate-leaf dogwood
 Cornus amomum — silky dogwood
 Cornus canadensis — Canada bunchberry
 Cornus drummondii — northern roughleaf dogwood
 Cornus florida — flowering dogwood
 Cornus nuttallii — Pacific dogwood
 Cornus racemosa — grey dogwood
 Cornus rugosa — roundleaf dogwood
 Cornus sericea — silky dogwood
 Cornus suecica — Swedish dwarf dogwood
 Cornus × unalaschkensis — western dwarf dogwood
 Cornus × acadiensis
 Cornus × slavinii

Crassulaceae 

 Crassula aquatica — water pygmyweed
 Crassula connata — sand pygmyweed
 Penthorum sedoides — ditch-stonecrop
 Rhodiola integrifolia — entire-leaf stonecrop
 Rhodiola rosea — roseroot stonecrop
 Sedum divergens — spreading stonecrop
 Sedum lanceolatum — lanceleaf stonecrop
 Sedum oreganum — Oregon stonecrop
 Sedum spathulifolium — Pacific stonecrop
 Sedum stenopetalum — narrowpetal stonecrop
 Sedum villosum — purple stonecrop

Cucurbitaceae 

 Echinocystis lobata — wild mock-cucumber
 Marah oreganus — coast manroot
 Sicyos angulatus — one-seed bur-cucumber

Cupressaceae 

 Chamaecyparis nootkatensis — Alaska cedar
 Juniperus communis — ground juniper
 Juniperus horizontalis — creeping juniper
 Juniperus scopulorum — Rocky Mountain juniper
 Juniperus virginiana — eastern red-cedar
 Juniperus x fassettii
 Thuja occidentalis — northern white-cedar
 Thuja plicata — western red-cedar

Cuscutaceae 

 Cuscuta cephalanthi — buttonbush dodder
 Cuscuta coryli — hazel dodder
 Cuscuta gronovii — Gronovius dodder
 Cuscuta megalocarpa — bigfruit dodder
 Cuscuta pentagona — field dodder
 Cuscuta polygonorum — smartweed dodder
 Cuscuta salina — saltmarsh dodder

Cyperaceae 

 Blysmus rufus — red bulrush
 Bulbostylis capillaris — densetuft hairsedge
 Carex adelostoma — circumpolar sedge
 Carex adusta — crowded sedge
 Carex aggregata — glomerate sedge
 Carex alata — broadwing sedge
 Carex albicans — bellow-beaked sedge
 Carex albonigra — black-and-white scale sedge
 Carex albursina — white bear sedge
 Carex alopecoidea — foxtail sedge
 Carex amphibola — eastern narrowleaf sedge
 Carex amplifolia — bigleaf sedge
 Carex anguillata — snail sedge
 Carex annectens — yellowfruit sedge
 Carex anthoxanthea — yellow-flowered sedge
 Carex aperta — Columbian sedge
 Carex appalachica — Appalachian sedge
 Carex aquatilis — water sedge
 Carex arcta — northern clustered sedge
 Carex arctata — black sedge
 Carex arctiformis — polar sedge
 Carex argyrantha — hay sedge
 Carex assiniboinensis — Assiniboine sedge
 Carex atherodes — awned sedge
 Carex athrostachya — jointed-spike sedge
 Carex atlantica — prickly bog sedge
 Carex atratiformis — black sedge
 Carex atrofusca — scorched alpine sedge
 Carex atrosquama — blackened sedge
 Carex aurea — golden-fruit sedge
 Carex backii — Rocky Mountain sedge
 Carex baileyi — Bailey's sedge
 Carex bebbii — Bebb's sedge
 Carex bicknellii — Bicknell's sedge
 Carex bicolor — two-colour sedge
 Carex bigelowii — Bigelow's sedge
 Carex bipartita — Arctic hare's-foot sedge
 Carex blanda — woodland sedge
 Carex bolanderi — Bolander's sedge
 Carex bonanzensis — Yukon sedge
 Carex brevicaulis — shortstem sedge
 Carex brevior — fescue sedge
 Carex bromoides — bromelike sedge
 Carex brunnescens — brownish sedge
 Carex bullata — button sedge
 Carex buxbaumii — Buxbaum's sedge
 Carex canescens — hoary sedge
 Carex capillaris — hairlike sedge
 Carex capitata — capitate sedge
 Carex careyana — Carey's sedge
 Carex castanea — chestnut-coloured sedge
 Carex cephaloidea — thinleaf sedge
 Carex cephalophora — ovalleaf sedge
 Carex chordorrhiza — creeping sedge
 Carex circinata — coiled sedge
 Carex communis — fibrous-root sedge
 Carex comosa — bristly sedge
 Carex concinna — beautiful sedge
 Carex concinnoides — northwestern sedge
 Carex conoidea — field sedge
 Carex cordillerana — Cordillera sedge
 Carex crawei — Crawe's sedge
 Carex crawfordii — Crawford's sedge
 Carex crinita — fringed sedge
 Carex cristatella — crested sedge
 Carex crus-corvi — ravenfoot sedge
 Carex cryptolepis — northeastern sedge
 Carex cumulata — clustered sedge
 Carex cusickii — Cusick's sedge
 Carex davisii — Davis' sedge
 Carex debilis — white-edge sedge
 Carex deflexa — short-stemmed sedge
 Carex deweyana — shortscale sedge
 Carex diandra — lesser panicled sedge
 Carex digitalis — slender wood sedge
 Carex disperma — softleaf sedge
 Carex douglasii — Douglas' sedge
 Carex duriuscula — needleleaf sedge
 Carex dutillyi — Dutilly's sedge
 Carex eburnea — ebony sedge
 Carex echinata — little prickly sedge
 Carex eleusinoides — goosegrass sedge
 Carex emoryi — Emory's sedge
 Carex engelmannii — Engelmann's sedge
 Carex exilis — coast sedge
 Carex exsiccata — beaked sedge
 Carex festucacea — fescue sedge
 Carex feta — green-sheath sedge
 Carex filifolia — thread-leaved sedge
 Carex flaccosperma — thinfruit sedge
 Carex flava — yellow sedge
 Carex folliculata — long sedge
 Carex formosa — handsome sedge
 Carex frankii — Frank's sedge
 Carex garberi — elk sedge
 Carex geyeri — Geyer's sedge
 Carex glacialis — alpine sedge
 Carex glareosa — weak-cluster sedge
 Carex gmelinii — Gmelin's sedge
 Carex gracilescens — slender sedge
 Carex gracillima — graceful sedge
 Carex granularis — meadow sedge
 Carex gravida — heavy-fruited sedge
 Carex grayi — Asa Gray's sedge
 Carex grisea — inflated narrowleaf sedge
 Carex gynandra — nodding sedge
 Carex gynocrates — northern bog sedge
 Carex hallii — Hall's sedge
 Carex hassei — Hasse's sedge
 Carex haydeniana — Hayden's sedge
 Carex haydenii — cloud sedge
 Carex heleonastes — Hudson Bay sedge
 Carex hendersonii — Henderson's sedge
 Carex heteroneura — different-nerve sedge
 Carex hirsutella — hirsute sedge
 Carex hirtifolia — pubescent sedge
 Carex hitchcockiana — Hitchcock's sedge
 Carex holostoma — Arctic marsh sedge
 Carex hoodii — Hood's sedge
 Carex hookeriana — Hooker's sedge
 Carex hormathodes — marsh straw sedge
 Carex hostiana — host sedge
 Carex houghtoniana — Houghton's sedge
 Carex houghtoniana — shoreline sedge
 Carex hystericina — porcupine sedge
 Carex illota — smallhead sedge
 Carex incurviformis — seaside sedge
 Carex infirminervia
 Carex inops — longstolon sedge
 Carex interior — inland sedge
 Carex interrupta — green-fruited sedge
 Carex intumescens — greater bladder sedge
 Carex jamesii — Nebraska sedge
 Carex juniperorum — cedar sedge
 Carex krausei — Krause's sedge
 Carex lacustris — lakebank sedge
 Carex laeviconica — smooth-cone sedge
 Carex laeviculmis — smoothstem sedge
 Carex laevivaginata — smooth-sheath sedge
 Carex lapponica — Lapland sedge
 Carex lasiocarpa — slender sedge
 Carex laxa — weak sedge
 Carex laxiculmis — spreading sedge
 Carex laxiflora — looseflower sedge
 Carex leavenworthii — Leavenworth's sedge
 Carex lenticularis — shore sedge
 Carex leptalea — bristly-stalk sedge
 Carex leptonervia — finely-nerve sedge
 Carex leptopoda — short-scaled sedge
 Carex limosa — mud sedge
 Carex livida — livid sedge
 Carex loliacea — rye-grass sedge
 Carex longii — greenish-white sedge
 Carex lucorum — blue ridge sedge
 Carex lugens — spruce-muskeg sedge
 Carex lupuliformis — false hop sedge
 Carex lupulina — hop sedge
 Carex lurida — shallow sedge
 Carex luzulina — woodrush sedge
 Carex lyngbyei — Lyngbye's sedge
 Carex mackenziei — MacKenzie's sedge
 Carex macloviana — Falkland Island sedge
 Carex macrocephala — bighead sedge
 Carex macrochaeta — Alaska largeawn sedge
 Carex magellanica — boreal bog sedge
 Carex marina — sea sedge
 Carex maritima — seaside sedge
 Carex meadii — Mead's sedge
 Carex membranacea — fragile-seed sedge
 Carex merritt-fernaldii — Merritt Fernald's sedge
 Carex mertensii — Merten's sedge
 Carex mesochorea — midland sedge
 Carex michauxiana — Michaux's sedge
 Carex microchaeta — alpine tundra sedge
 Carex microglochin — false uncinia sedge
 Carex microptera — smallwing sedge
 Carex misandra — shortleaf sedge
 Carex misandroides — man-hater sedge
 Carex molesta — troublesome sedge
 Carex muehlenbergii — Mühlenberg's sedge
 Carex muskingumensis — Muskingum sedge
 Carex nardina — nard sedge
 Carex nebrascensis — Nebraska sedge
 Carex nigra — black sedge
 Carex nigricans — black alpine sedge
 Carex nigromarginata — blackedge sedge
 Carex normalis — greater straw sedge
 Carex norvegica — Scandinavian sedge
 Carex novae-angliae — New England sedge
 Carex obnupta — slough sedge
 Carex obtusata — blunt sedge
 Carex oligocarpa — eastern few-fruit sedge
 Carex oligosperma — few-seed sedge
 Carex ormostachya — necklace spike sedge
 Carex ovalis Willd. ex Kunth —  nom. illeg. synonym for correct name, C. scoparia
 Carex pachystachya — thickhead sedge
 Carex paleacea — chaffy sedge
 Carex pallescens — pale sedge
 Carex pansa — sand-dune sedge
 Carex parryana — Parry's sedge
 Carex pauciflora — few-flower sedge
 Carex paysonis — Payson's sedge
 Carex peckii — white-tinged sedge
 Carex pedunculata — longstalk sedge
 Carex pellita — woolly sedge
 Carex pensylvanica — Pennsylvania sedge
 Carex petasata — liddon sedge
 Carex petricosa — rock sedge
 Carex phaeocephala — mountain hare sedge
 Carex piperi — Piper's sedge
 Carex plantaginea — plantain-leaf sedge
 Carex platylepis — broadscale sedge
 Carex platyphylla — broadleaf sedge
 Carex pluriflora — several-flowered sedge
 Carex podocarpa — shortstalk sedge
 Carex praeceptorum — teacher's sedge
 Carex praegracilis — clustered field sedge
 Carex prairea — prairie sedge
 Carex prasina — drooping sedge
 Carex praticola — northern meadow sedge
 Carex preslii — Presl's sedge
 Carex projecta — necklace sedge
 Carex proposita — Smoky Mountain sedge
 Carex pseudocyperus — cyperus-like sedge
 Carex pyrenaica — Pyrenean sedge
 Carex radiata — stellate sedge
 Carex ramenskii — Ramenski's sedge
 Carex rariflora — loose-flowered sedge
 Carex raymondii — black sedge
 Carex raynoldsii — Raynolds' sedge
 Carex recta — saltmarsh sedge
 Carex retroflexa — reflexed sedge
 Carex retrorsa — retrorse sedge
 Carex richardsonii — Richardson's sedge
 Carex rosea — rosy sedge
 Carex rossii — short sedge
 Carex rostrata — beaked sedge
 Carex rotundata — roundfruit sedge
 Carex rufina — snowbed sedge
 Carex rupestris — rock sedge
 Carex sabulosa — sand sedge
 Carex salina — saltmarsh sedge
 Carex sartwellii — Sartwell's sedge
 Carex saxatilis — russett sedge
 Carex saximontana — Rocky Mountain sedge
 Carex scabrata — rough sedge
 Carex schweinitzii — Schweinitz' sedge
 Carex scirpoidea — bulrush sedge
 Carex scoparia — broom sedge
 Carex scopulorum — Holm's Rocky Mountain sedge
 Carex seorsa — weak stellate sedge
 Carex shortiana — Short's sedge
 Carex siccata — dryspike sedge
 Carex silicea — seabeach sedge
 Carex simulata — copycat sedge
 Carex sparganioides — bur-reed sedge
 Carex spectabilis — northwestern showy sedge
 Carex sprengelii — longbeak sedge
 Carex squarrosa — squarrose sedge
 Carex sterilis — dioecious sedge
 Carex stipata — awl-fruit sedge
 Carex striatula — lined sedge
 Carex stricta — tussock sedge
 Carex stylosa — long-styled sedge
 Carex suberecta — prairie straw sedge
 Carex subfusca — rusty sedge
 Carex subspathacea — Hoppner's sedge
 Carex supina — weak Arctic sedge
 Carex swanii — Swan's sedge
 Carex sychnocephala — many-headed sedge
 Carex tahoensis — Lake Tahoe sedge
 Carex tenera — slender sedge
 Carex tenuiflora — sparseflower sedge
 Carex terrae-novae — Newfoundland sedge
 Carex tetanica — rigid sedge
 Carex tincta — tinged sedge
 Carex tonsa — shaved sedge
 Carex torreyi — Torrey's sedge
 Carex torta — twisted sedge
 Carex tribuloides — blunt broom sedge
 Carex trichocarpa — hairyfruit sedge
 Carex trisperma — three-seed sedge
 Carex tuckermanii — Tuckerman's sedge
 Carex tumulicola — foothill sedge
 Carex typhina — cattail sedge
 Carex umbellata — hidden sedge
 Carex unilateralis — one-sided sedge
 Carex ursina — bear sedge
 Carex utriculata — beaked sedge
 Carex vacillans
 Carex vaginata — sheathed sedge
 Carex vallicola — valley sedge
 Carex vesicaria — inflated sedge
 Carex virescens — ribbed sedge
 Carex viridula — little green sedge
 Carex vulpinoidea — fox sedge
 Carex wiegandii — Wiegand's sedge
 Carex willdenowii — Willdenow's sedge
 Carex williamsii — Williams' sedge
 Carex woodii — pretty sedge
 Carex x abitibiana — Abitibi sedge
 Carex x anticostensis — Anticosti sedge
 Carex x calderi — Calder's sedge
 Carex x connectens
 Carex x crinitoides
 Carex x exsalina
 Carex x firmior
 Carex x flavicans
 Carex x grahamii — Graham's sedge
 Carex x hartii — Hart's sedge
 Carex x helvola
 Carex x josephi-schmittii — Joseph Schmitt's sedge
 Carex x knieskernii — Knieskern's sedge
 Carex x langeana — Lange's sedge
 Carex x leutzii — Leutz' sedge
 Carex x limula
 Carex x mainensis — Maine sedge
 Carex x mendica
 Carex x neobigelowii
 Carex x neofilipendula
 Carex x neomiliaris
 Carex x neopaleacea
 Carex x neorigida
 Carex x nubens
 Carex x paleacoides
 Carex x pannewitziana — Pannewitz' sedge
 Carex x patuensis
 Carex x persalina
 Carex x physocarpioides
 Carex x pieperiana — Pieper's sedge
 Carex x pseudohelvola
 Carex x quebecensis — Québec sedge
 Carex x quirponensis
 Carex x reducta
 Carex x rollandii — Rolland's sedge
 Carex x saxenii — Saxen's sedge
 Carex x spiculosa
 Carex x stenolepis
 Carex x subimpressa
 Carex x sublimosa
 Carex x subnigra
 Carex x subpaleacea
 Carex x subreducta
 Carex x subsalina
 Carex x subviridula
 Carex x sullivantii — Sullivant's sedge
 Carex x supergoodenoughii — Goodenough's sedge
 Carex x trichina
 Carex x ungavensis — Ungava sedge
 Carex xerantica — white-scaled sedge
 Cladium mariscoides — twigrush
 Cyperus bipartitus — shining flatsedge
 Cyperus dentatus — toothed sedge
 Cyperus diandrus — umbrella flatsedge
 Cyperus echinatus — globe flatsedge
 Cyperus eragrostis — tall flatsedge
 Cyperus erythrorhizos — redroot flatsedge
 Cyperus esculentus — Chufa flatsedge
 Cyperus flavescens — yellow flatsedge
 Cyperus houghtonii — Houghton's umbrella-sedge
 Cyperus lupulinus — Great Plains flatsedge
 Cyperus odoratus — rusty flatsedge
 Cyperus schweinitzii — Schweinitz' flatsedge
 Cyperus squarrosus — awned cyperus
 Cyperus strigosus — straw-coloured flatsedge
 Dulichium arundinaceum — three-way sedge
 Eleocharis acicularis — least spikerush
 Eleocharis aestuum
 Eleocharis atropurpurea — purple spikerush
 Eleocharis compressa — flat-stemmed spikerush
 Eleocharis diandra — Wright's spikerush
 Eleocharis elliptica — slender spikerush
 Eleocharis engelmannii — Engelmann's spikerush
 Eleocharis equisetoides — horsetail spikerush
 Eleocharis erythropoda — bald spikerush
 Eleocharis fallax — creeping spikerush
 Eleocharis geniculata — capitate spikerush
 Eleocharis halophila — saltmarsh spikerush
 Eleocharis intermedia — matted spikerush
 Eleocharis kamtschatica — Kamtchatka spikerush
 Eleocharis macrostachya — creeping spikerush
 Eleocharis mamillata — softstem spikerush
 Eleocharis nitida — slender spikerush
 Eleocharis obtusa — blunt spikerush
 Eleocharis olivacea — capitate spikerush
 Eleocharis ovata — ovate spikerush
 Eleocharis palustris — creeping spikerush
 Eleocharis parvula — small spikerush
 Eleocharis quadrangulata — squarestem spikerush
 Eleocharis quinqueflora — few-flower spikerush
 Eleocharis robbinsii — Robbins' spikerush
 Eleocharis rostellata — beaked spikerush
 Eleocharis smallii — Small's creeping spikerush
 Eleocharis tenuis — slender spikerush
 Eleocharis tuberculosa — long-tuberculed spikerush
 Eleocharis uniglumis — creeping spikerush
 Eriophorum altaicum — white-bristle cottongrass
 Eriophorum angustifolium — narrowleaf cottongrass
 Eriophorum brachyantherum — shortanther cottongrass
 Eriophorum callitrix — sheathed cottongrass
 Eriophorum chamissonis — russett cottongrass
 Eriophorum gracile — slender cottongrass
 Eriophorum russeolum — russet cottongrass
 Eriophorum scheuchzeri — Scheuchzer's cottongrass
 Eriophorum tenellum — rough cottongrass
 Eriophorum vaginatum — tussock cottongrass
 Eriophorum virginicum — tawny cottongrass
 Eriophorum viridicarinatum — green-keeled cottongrass
 Eriophorum x gauthieri — Gauthier's cottongrass
 Eriophorum x medium
 Eriophorum x porsildii — Porsild's cottongrass
 Eriophorum x pylaieanum
 Eriophorum x rousseauanum — Rousseau's cottongrass
 Fimbristylis autumnalis — slender fimbry
 Fimbristylis puberula — hairy fimbristylis
 Fuirena pumila — dwarf umbrella-sedge
 Isolepis cernua — low bulrush
 Kobresia myosuroides — Pacific kobresia
 Kobresia sibirica — Siberian kobresia
 Kobresia simpliciuscula — simple kobresia
 Lipocarpha micrantha — dwarf bulrush
 Rhynchospora alba — white beakrush
 Rhynchospora capillacea — horned beakrush
 Rhynchospora capitellata — brownish beakrush
 Rhynchospora fusca — brown beakrush
 Schoenoplectus acutus — hardstem bulrush
 Schoenoplectus americanus — three-square bulrush
 Schoenoplectus fluviatilis — river bulrush
 Schoenoplectus heterochaetus — slender bulrush
 Schoenoplectus maritimus — saltmarsh bulrush
 Schoenoplectus novae-angliae — New England bulrush
 Schoenoplectus pungens — three-square bulrush
 Schoenoplectus purshianus — weakstalk bulrush
 Schoenoplectus robustus — saltmarsh bulrush
 Schoenoplectus saximontanus — Rocky Mountain bulrush
 Schoenoplectus smithii — Smith's bulrush
 Schoenoplectus subterminalis — water bulrush
 Schoenoplectus tabernaemontani — softstem bulrush
 Schoenoplectus torreyi — Torrey's bulrush
 Schoenoplectus x oblongus
 Scirpus atrocinctus — black-girdle bulrush
 Scirpus atrovirens — woolgrass bulrush
 Scirpus cyperinus — cottongrass bulrush
 Scirpus expansus — woodland beakrush
 Scirpus georgianus — Georgia bulrush
 Scirpus hattorianus
 Scirpus longii — Long's bulrush
 Scirpus microcarpus — smallfruit bulrush
 Scirpus nevadensis — Nevada bulrush
 Scirpus pallidus — pale bulrush
 Scirpus pedicellatus — stalked bulrush
 Scirpus pendulus — pendulous bulrush
 Scirpus x peckii — Peck's bulrush
 Scleria pauciflora — few-flower nutrush
 Scleria triglomerata — whip nutrush
 Scleria verticillata — low nutrush
 Trichophorum alpinum — alpine cottongrass
 Trichophorum caespitosum — tufted clubrush
 Trichophorum clintonii — Clinton's bulrush
 Trichophorum planifolium — bashful bulrush
 Trichophorum pumilum — Rolland's leafless-bulrush